The first edition of the textbook Data Science and Predictive Analytics: Biomedical and Health Applications using R, authored by Ivo D. Dinov, was published in August 2018 by Springer. The second edition of the book was printed in 2023.

This textbook covers some of the mathematical foundations, computational techniques, and artificial intelligence approaches used in data science research and applications.

Using the statistical computing platform R and a broad range of biomedical case-studies, the 23 chapters of the book first edition provide explicit examples of importing, exporting, processing, modeling, visualizing, and interpreting large, multivariate, incomplete, heterogeneous, longitudinal, and incomplete datasets (big data).

Structure

First edition table of contents
The first edition of the Data Science and Predictive Analytics (DSPA) textbook  is divided into the following 23 chapters, each progressively building on the previous content.

 Motivation
 Foundations of R
 Managing Data in R
 Data Visualization
 Linear Algebra & Matrix Computing
 Dimensionality Reduction
 Lazy Learning: Classification Using Nearest Neighbors
 Probabilistic Learning: Classification Using Naive Bayes
 Decision Tree Divide and Conquer Classification
 Forecasting Numeric Data Using Regression Models
 Black Box Machine-Learning Methods: Neural Networks and Support Vector Machines
 Apriori Association Rules Learning
 k-Means Clustering
 Model Performance Assessment
 Improving Model Performance
 Specialized Machine Learning Topics
 Variable/Feature Selection
 Regularized Linear Modeling and Controlled Variable Selection
 Big Longitudinal Data Analysis
 Natural Language Processing/Text Mining
 Prediction and Internal Statistical Cross Validation
 Function Optimization
 Deep Learning, Neural Networks

Second edition table of contents
The significantly reorganized revised edition of the book (2023)   expands and modernizes the presented mathematical principles, computational methods, data science techniques, model-based machine learning and model-free artificial intelligence algorithms. The 14 chapters of the new edition start with an introduction and progressively build foundational skills to naturally reach biomedical applications of deep learning.

 Introduction
 Basic Visualization and Exploratory Data Analytics
 Linear Algebra, Matrix Computing, and Regression Modeling
 Linear and Nonlinear Dimensionality Reduction
 Supervised Classification
 Black Box Machine Learning Methods
 Qualitative Learning Methods—Text Mining, Natural Language Processing, and Apriori Association Rules Learning
 Unsupervised Clustering
 Model Performance Assessment, Validation, and Improvement
 Specialized Machine Learning Topics
 Variable Importance and Feature Selection
 Big Longitudinal Data Analysis
 Function Optimization
 Deep Learning, Neural Networks

Reception
The materials in the Data Science and Predictive Analytics (DSPA) textbook have been peer reviewed in the International Statistical Institute’s  ISI Review Journal and the Journal of the American Library Association. Many scholarly publications reference the DSPA textbook.

As of January 17, 2021, the electronic version of the book first edition is freely available on SpringerLink and has been downloaded over 6 million times. The textbook is globally available in print (hardcover and softcover) and electronic formats (PDF and EPub) in many college and university libraries and has been used for data science, computational statistics, and analytics classes at various institutions.

References

External links
 DSPA textbook (1st edition) Springer website and SpringerLink EBook download
 DSPA textbook (2nd edition) Springer website is published in The Springer Series in Applied Machine Learning (SSAML)
 Textbook supporting website

2023 non-fiction books
Statistics books
Artificial intelligence
Computer science books
Springer Science+Business Media books